Faxonius deanae, the Conchas crayfish is a species of crayfish in the family Cambaridae. It is endemic to the United States. The common name refers to the Conchas Lake, where the original specimens were found.

References

External links

Cambaridae
Fauna of the United States
Freshwater crustaceans of North America
Crustaceans described in 1975
Taxobox binomials not recognized by IUCN